The Okkervil is a river in Leningrad Oblast and the eastern part of the city of Saint Petersburg, Russia. It is the largest left tributary of the Okhta.

The name Okkervil appeared in the 17th century, after the Swedish colonel who owned an estate on the bank. On some ancient maps of Saint Petersburg, the river is called Little Okhta as opposed to Big Okhta. Yet other times it is called Porkhovka.

"Okkervil River" is the title of a well-known short story by Tatyana Tolstaya. The Austin, Texas-based indie rock band named Okkervil River takes its name from the story.

Bridges
There are eight bridges across Okkervil River:

 Utkin Bridge
 Zanevsky Bridge
 Yablonovsky Bridge
 Rossijsky Bridge
 Kollontay Bridge
 Podvoisky Bridge
 Tovarischesky Bridge
 Dybenko Bridge

References

Rivers of Leningrad Oblast
Rivers of Saint Petersburg
Karelian Isthmus